Das freie Volk ('The Free People') was a daily newspaper published from Danzig between December 1918 and 1921. The newspaper was the organ of the Independent Social Democratic Party of Germany in West and East Prussia. In 1921 it became the organ of the Danzig district of the Communist Party of Germany. The Communist Party later started a new newspaper, Danziger Arbeiterzeitung.

References

1918 establishments in Germany
1921 disestablishments in Germany
Communist newspapers
Communist Party of Germany
Defunct newspapers published in Germany
German-language communist newspapers
Mass media in Gdańsk
Daily newspapers published in Germany
Publications established in 1918
Publications disestablished in 1921
Socialist newspapers